

Portugal
Angola – José Maria de Sousa Macedo Almeida e Vasconcelos, Governor of Angola (1829–1834)

United Kingdom
Barbados – Sir James Lyon (1829–1833)
 Malta Colony – Frederick Cavendish Ponsonby, Governor of Malta (1827–1835)
 New South Wales – Major-General Richard Bourke, Governor of New South Wales (1831–1837)
 Western Australia
 Captain James Stirling, Governor of Western Australia (1828–1839)
 ''note:  Stirling governed Western Australia as a Lieutenant-Governor (30 December 1828 – 4 March 1832), when he was granted the title of Governor

Colonial governors
Colonial governors
1832